Téteghem-Coudekerque-Village is a commune in the Nord department of northern France. The municipality was established on 1 January 2016 and consists of the former communes of Téteghem and Coudekerque-Village.

Population
The population data given in the table below refer to the commune in its geography as of January 2020.

See also 
Communes of the Nord department

References 

Communes of Nord (French department)
Communes nouvelles of Nord

Populated places established in 2016
2016 establishments in France
French Flanders